This is a partial list of artists currently and/or formerly signed to independent record label, MNRK Music Group. It includes artists who were on the Koch or Audium labels as well.



0-9
 2Pac (Death Row/E1/Interscope)
 40 Cal. (Diplomat/E1)
 The 5 Browns (E1)
 Akir (Viper/Babygrande/E1)
 98 Degrees

A
 Ace Frehley
 Oleta Adams
 Anew Revolution
 Ani DiFranco (Righteous Babe/E1)
 Arkaea
 Ashanti (Written Entertainment/E1)
 Avalon
 Avatar
 AZ
 Azealia Banks

B
 Blackhole
 Baby D (Big Oomp/E1)
 The Bangles
 Basia
 Benny The Butcher
 Big Noyd
 Big Moe
 Big Pokey
 Bizarre (rapper)
 Black Label Society
 Black Map
 Blueface
 Bodysnatcher
 Brandy (Brand Nu Entertainment/eOne Music)
 Bryant Myers
 Brian McKnight (Hard Work/E1)
 Foxy Brown
 Richard Butler
 David Ball
 B.G.
 Tamar Braxton (Tamaritan Land/E1)
 Trina Braxton (SolTri/E1)
 Traci Braxton
 Britney Spears

C
 The Callous Daoboys
 Cash Out (Bases Loaded/E1)
 Cassidy (Krossover/E1)
 Chickenfoot
 Chimaira
 Chris Webby (Eighty HD MUSIC/E1)
 Ashley Cleveland
 Confederate Railroad (E1, formerly on Audium & Shanachie)
 The Contortionist (E1/Good Fight Music)
 John Cowan
 Carl Cox
 Crowbar
ChriZzy Goodtung
 Chief Keef
 Cradle Of Filth (Koch Records)

D
 Charlie Daniels (Blue Hat)
 Darkest Hour
 Dark Sermon
 David Archuleta
 Daz Dillinger (Doggystyle/E1)
 Death from Above
 Derek Minor
 Dirge Within
 Devin The Dude
 DJ Encore
 DJ Khaled (We the Best Music Group/E1)
 Dope
 Dirtfedd
 Donell Jones
 Jerry Douglas
 Dwele
 Dorrough (E1)

E
 Elle Varner
 En Vogue
 Faith Evans (Prolific/E1)
 Enterprise Earth (E1/Good Fight Music)
 Eyes Set to Kill (BreakSilence/E1)

F
 Fat Joe (Terror Squad/E1)
 Fair to Midland
 FBG Cash (Fly Boy Gang)
 Fifth on the Floor (Black Country Rock/eOne Music)
 Fit for an Autopsy
 Funkmaster Flex
 Ken Fowler
 Michael Franks

G
 Gangsta (Gutta/E1)
 Ginuwine
 Goodie Mob
 Vivian Green

H
 Havoc
 Hatebreed
 Hell Rell (Diplomat/E1)
 High on Fire
 Horse the Band
 The Human Abstract
 William Hung

I
 I-20 (rapper) (dukor/Disturbing Tha Peace)
 Ian Brown
 Iconz
 Imani Winds
 Impending Doom
 In Flames (US distribution)

J
 Joe Budden
 Bob James
 Jedi Mind Tricks (Enemy Soil/E1)
 Jeff Golub
 Jim Jones (Diplomat/E1)
 Donell Jones
 Jordan Knight (JK Music/E1)
 J.R. Writer (Diplomat/Koch)
 Cledus T. Judd (E1, formerly on Audium/Koch)
 Leela James

K
 Kah-Lo
K.Michelle
Kermit Furiouz

L
 Larsiny Family (Krossover/E1)
 Lake (Death Row/E1)
 LeToya Luckett (E1)
 Lord Dying
 Lil' C-Style (Gangsta Advisory/E1)
 Lil' Kim  (Queen Bee Entertainment/E1)
 Lil Mo
 Little Big Town
 Lumineers

M
 Shorty Mack (Knockout/E1)
 Marley Marl
 Peter Malick
 Master P (E1)
 Jake Miller
 Max Thrilla
 Marcus Miller
 Marillion (Velvel/Koch - US)
 Cody McCarver (PLC/E1)
 Melissa Manchester
 Mephiskapheles (Velvel/Koch - US)
 Michel'le (Death Row/E1)
 Michelle Williams (Light Records/E1)
 Keith Murray (Def Squad/E1)
 The Myriad
 Mr. Hyde (Psycho+Logical/E1)
 Messy Marv
 Brian McKnight
 M.O.P.
 Moosh & Twist
 Montana of 300
 MyChildren MyBride

N
 Necro (Psycho+Logical/E1)
 Willie Norwood (Knockout/E1)

O
 Sinéad O'Connor
 Opeth
 Otep
 Overkill (Nuclear Blast/E1)

P
 Paradise Lost
 Playa (Gutta/E1)
 Pleasure P (Swagga Entertainment/E1)
 Clara Ponty (Care/E1)
 Pop Evil
 Prodigy (Infamous/E1)
 Project Pat
 Public Enemy
 Powerglove
 Prime Boys

Q
 Q-Unique (Psycho+Logical/E1)

R
 Ray J (Knockout/E1)
 RBX (Gangsta Advisory/E1)
 Reflections (Good Fight/E1)
 Restless Heart (Audium/Koch)
 Rich Boyz (Gutta/E1)
 Rich Boy
 Romeo Miller (Gutta/E1)
 Royal Bliss
 RZA
 Ron Isley
 Royce da 5'9 (Koch E1)

S
 Sabac Red (Psycho+Logical/E1)
 Sabrina (WIDEawake/Death Row/E1)
 Satyricon (Roadrunner/E1)
 Scorpions (Koch/E1)
 Sha Stimuli
 Skyharbor (E1/Good Fight Music)
 Maia Sharp
 Sheek Louch (D-Block/E1)
 Shemy (ClockWerk/KRD/Oarfin/E1)
 Silkk The Shocker (No Limit/Gutta/E1)
 Daryle Singletary (E1, formerly on Audium/Koch)
 Slash's Snakepit
 Slaughterhouse (former)
 Slim Thug (Boss Hogg/E1)
 Smile Empty Soul
 Some Girls
 Splendora
 Soulja Boy
 Spoken
 Stabbing Westward
 Ringo Starr
 Styles P (D-Block/Ruff Ryderz/E1)
 Syleena Johnson
 Skull Gang (Skull Gang/E1/Koch Records)
 Straight Line Stitch
 Sundy Best
 Maggie Szabo

T
 Tamia
 Terrance Quaites
 Texas Hippie Coalition
 Tha Dogg Pound (Doggystyle/E1)
 Tha Realest (Black Diamond/E1)
 The Blue Stones
 The Game
 The Lumineers
 Through the Eyes of the Dead
 Throwdown (2009)
 This or the Apocalypse
 Time for Three (Tf3) 3 Fervent Travelers (2010)
 Token
 Torus
 Toxic Holocaust
 Trick Trick
 TRU (No Limit/Gutta/E1)
 Trust Company (2010)
 Torture T (Torturenati Records/E1)

U
 Unearth
 Unk (Big Oomp/E1)
 The U.N (Diplomat/E1)

V
 Will Varley
 Jim Verraros (TTL/E1)

W
 Warren G (TTL/E1)
 Doug Wamble
 Dale Watson
 Westurn Union (Doggystyle/E1)
 Within the Ruins
 Wu-Tang Clan

X
 Xzibit (Open Bar/E1)

Y
 Young V (Gutta/E1)
 Yung Berg

Z
 Zardonic
 Zoroaster

See also
 E1 Music
 List of record labels

References

MNRK